Yang Wenjie (born 30 December 1988) is a Chinese footballer who plays as a forward for Chinese club Tianjin Fusheng.

Career

Yang started his career with Chinese side Tianjin Dongli. After that, he signed for Bangkok FC in the Thai second division. Before the second half of 2013–14, Yang signed for Bosnia and Herzegovina third division club  FK Lokomotiva Brčko. Before the second half of 2014–15, he signed for Borac (Banja Luka) in the Bosnia and Herzegovina top flight. Before the 2016 season, he signed for Chinese third division team Shaanxi Chang'an Athletic after trialing for Mechelen in Belgium and Chinese top flight outfit Tianjin TEDA.

References

External links

Chinese footballers
Living people
Expatriate footballers in Bosnia and Herzegovina
Association football forwards
Chinese expatriate footballers
Chinese expatriate sportspeople in Bosnia and Herzegovina
China League Two players
Yang Wenjie
FK Borac Banja Luka players
Shaanxi Chang'an Athletic F.C. players
1988 births
Chinese expatriate sportspeople in Thailand
Expatriate footballers in Thailand